Deer Creek is a stream in northwestern Benton County, Arkansas and southwestern McDonald County, Missouri. It is a tributary of Butler Creek.

Deer Creek was named for the numerous deer along its course.

See also
List of rivers of Arkansas
List of rivers of Missouri

References

Rivers of Benton County, Arkansas
Rivers of McDonald County, Missouri
Rivers of Arkansas
Rivers of Missouri